Angelica is a Puerto Rico film made in 2016 by Marisol Gómez-Mouakad. Based on colorism, sexism and racism, the movie centers on a girl with an Afro-Latino father and a white Latina mother who aspires to be a Fashion designer and faces discrimination from her mother.

The effects and her journey on finding her identity and standing up for herself is portrayed along with her struggles throughout the movie.
It won an award at the Africa Movie Academy Award for Best Diaspora Feature in 2018.

Synopsis 
Angelica, an African-Puerto Rican, has spent her whole life fighting to affirm, legitimize and explore her Africaness inside her family and in Puerto Rico, a society that denigrates and dismisses her Africaness. A rare drama that looks at the color contradictions and consequences in Puerto Rico and throughout the Afro-Latin world.

Cast 

 Michelle Nono
 Johanna Rosaly
 Willie Denton
 Rene Monclova
 Yamil Collazo
 Modesto Lacen
 Kisha Tikina Burgos

References 

2016 films
2010s Spanish-language films
Best Diaspora Feature Africa Movie Academy Award winners